NGC 4349-127 is a probable red giant approximately 6,100 light-years away in the constellation of Crux.  As a member of the open cluster NGC 4349 (hence the name NGC 4349-127), it is located about 2000 parsecs (about 6500 light years) from the Sun.  Its mass is estimated at 3.9 times Solar, and its age is about 200 million years.

In 2007, this star was found to have a substellar companion. NGC 4349-127 b is a brown dwarf (based on its mass) with nearly 20 times the mass of Jupiter. Within an eccentricity of about 0.19, its orbit is moderately elliptical, about the same as Mercury in the Solar System. It orbits its host star at a distance of 2.38 AU in a period of 677.8 days. This object was discovered by Christophe Lovis and Michel Mayor of the Geneva Observatory using the radial velocity technique.

However, a 2018 study with the same C. Lovis as an author found that the radial velocity signal corresponding to the proposed substellar companion was most likely caused by stellar activity, and thus the companion does not exist.

See also 
 NGC 2423-3

References

External links 

 
 SIMBAD NGC 4349 127b

Crux (constellation)
Brown dwarfs
M-type giants